Owen Alphonsus Murtagh (9 November 1887 – 18 February 1937) was an Australian rules footballer who played with St Kilda in the Victorian Football League (VFL).

Notes

External links 

 Owen Murtagh, at The VFA Project.

1887 births
1937 deaths
Australian rules footballers from Victoria (Australia)
St Kilda Football Club players